Rawe may refer to:
 Rawe (Rajput clan), a Subgroup of Rajput clans of India 
 Rawe Peak, in Nevada, US
 Donald Rawe (born 1930), British author and publisher
 Jackie Rawe, Shakatak band member
 Stuart Rawe, actor

See also 
 O'Rawe, a surname
 Raw (disambiguation)
 Raue